Bili Oslavy is a village in Nadvirna Raion of Ivano-Frankivsk Oblast of Ukraine. It belongs to Deliatyn settlement hromada, one of the hromadas of Ukraine.

History
Bili Oslavy was founded in around 1552, and the first written mention of its current name occurred in 1745.

Father Ivan Mandychevskyi was the parish priest in the village. In 1823, he had a son, the future Greek Catholic priest Porfiry, who later became the organizer of the coronation of the Miraculous Icon of the Mother of God of Zarvany. During the Kovpak raid, the police department shot dead 71 villagers.

On 1 August 1934, the rural commune of Oslava Byale was formed, the center of which was Bili Oslavy. The commune was formed from the previous self-governing rural communes: Oslava Byale, Oslava Charne, Potok Charna, Zazheche nad Prutem. According to the regional administration of the MGB, in 1949 in the Yaremchan district, the underground organization OUN was most active in the villages of Bili Oslavy and Chorni Oslavy. On 9 September 1967, an obelisk to the victims of Nazism was erected in the village. A monument to Taras Shevchenko was also installed in the village.

On 14 July 2014, the world's first monument to the famous Ukrainian poet Mariyka Pidhiryanka was solemnly opened and consecrated in her homeland in the village of Bili Oslavy.

References

Villages in Nadvirna Raion